Hebeloma birrus is a species of mushroom in the family Hymenogastraceae.

birrus
Fungi of Europe
Taxa named by Elias Magnus Fries